McLeavy is a surname. Notable people with the surname include:

Frank McLeavy, Baron McLeavy (1899–1976), British politician
John McLeavy Brown (1835–1926), British diplomat
Mike McLeavy (1898–?), Scottish footballer
Robin McLeavy (born 1981), Australian actress

See also
McLeary